Mostafalu or Mostafa Loo may refer to:

Mostafalu, Ardabil
Mostafalu, Qazvin
Mostafalu, Zanjan